After World War II the Italian Army had two units named "Centauro": from 1952 to 1986 the Armored Division "Centauro" and from 1986 to 2002 the Armored Brigade "Centauro". Both units were successor to the World War II era 131st Armored Division "Centauro". The units' name came from the mythological race of half human-half horse creatures named Centaurs.

History

World War II 
The 131st Armored Division "Centauro" was formed in April 1939. The division participated in the Greco-Italian War and invasion of Yugoslavia. In August 1942 the division was sent to Libya to fight in the Western Desert Campaign. After the Axis defeat in the Second Battle of El Alamein the division retreated with the German-Italian Panzer Army to Tunisia, where the division participated in the Tunisian Campaign. On 18 April 1943 the division was disbanded due to the losses suffered in the Battle of El Guettar.

Reconstitution 
On 1 April 1951 the Italian Army raised the Armored Brigade "Centauro" in Verona and assigned it to the 4th Army Corps. In fall of 1955 the brigade moved its headquarters to Novara and joined 3rd Army Corps, while the units of the brigade moved to Milan and Bellinzago Novarese. On 1 November 1959 the brigade was renamed Armored Division "Centauro" and consisted of the following units.

 Armored Division "Centauro", in Novara
 Division Headquarters
  3rd Bersaglieri Regiment, in Milan
 XVIII Bersaglieri Battalion (M3 Half-tracks)
 XX Bersaglieri Battalion (M3 Half-tracks)
 XXV Bersaglieri Battalion (M3 Half-tracks) 
 Bersaglieri Anti-tank Company with M40 recoilless rifles)
  31st Tank Regiment
 I Tank Battalion (M26 Pershing tanks, later replaced by M47 Patton main battle tanks)
 II Tank Battalion (M26 Pershing tanks, later replaced by M47 Patton main battle tanks)
 III Tank Battalion (M26 Pershing tanks, later replaced by M47 Patton main battle tanks)
  131st Armored Artillery Regiment
 I Self-propelled Howitzer Group (M7 Priest self-propelled howitzers)
 II Self-propelled Howitzer Group (M7 Priest self-propelled howitzers)
 III Self-propelled Howitzer Group (M7 Priest self-propelled howitzers)
 IV Self-propelled Howitzer Group (M7 Priest self-propelled howitzers)
 V Light Air-defense Group (M1 40mm anti-aircraft guns)
 VI Light Air-defense Group (M1 40mm anti-aircraft guns)
  Armored Cavalry Squadron "Cavalleggeri di Lodi" (M8 Greyhound)
 Engineer Battalion "Centauro"
 Signal Battalion "Centauro"
 Divisional Services

1963 reorganization 
In 1963 Italian divisions adapted their organization to NATO standards and thus added a brigade level to the divisions structure. The Centauro was now organized as follows:

 Armored Division "Centauro", in Novara
 Division Headquarters
 I Mechanized Brigade "Centauro", in Milan
  3rd Bersaglieri Regiment, in Milan
 VI Bersaglieri Battalion (M113 armored personnel carriers)
 X Bersaglieri Battalion (M113 armored personnel carriers)
 IV Tank Battalion (M47 Patton main battle tanks)
 Bersaglieri Anti-tank Company (M40 recoilless rifles)
 I Group/ 131st Armored Artillery Regiment (M7 Priest self propelled howitzers)
 I Service Battalion
 1st Engineer Company
 1st Signal Company
 II Armored Brigade "Centauro", in Novara
  1st Armored Bersaglieri Regiment, in Bellinzago Novarese
 VII Tank Battalion (M47 Patton main battle tanks)
 CI Tank Battalion (M47 Patton main battle tanks)
 I Bersaglieri Battalion (M113 armored personnel carriers)
 II Group/ 131st Armored Artillery Regiment (M7 Priest self propelled howitzers)
 II Service Battalion
 2nd Engineer Company
 2nd Signal Company
 III Armored Brigade "Centauro", in Novara
  31st Tank Regiment in Bellinzago Novarese
 I Tank Battalion (M47 Patton main battle tanks)
 IX Tank Battalion (M47 Patton main battle tanks)
 XVIII Bersaglieri Battalion (M113 armored personnel carriers)
 III Group/ 131st Armored Artillery Regiment (M7 Priest self propelled howitzers)
 III Service Battalion
 3rd Engineer Company
 3rd Signal Company
 Artillery Brigade "Centauro", in Vercelli)
  131st Armored Artillery Regiment, in Vercelli
 IV Heavy Self-propelled Field Artillery Group (M44 self propelled howitzers)
 V Heavy Self-propelled Artillery Group (M55 self propelled howitzers)
 VI Light Air-defense Group (L60 40mm anti-aircraft guns)
  XV Reconnaissance Squadrons Group "Cavalleggeri di Lodi" (M24 Chaffee light tanks and M113 armored personnel carriers)
 CXXXI Engineer Battalion
 CXXXI Signal Battalion
 Light Airplane Section "Centauro" (L-21B airplanes)
 Helicopter Section "Centauro" (AB 47J helicopters)

On 1 October 1968 the brigade headquarters were disbanded. The Armored Division "Centauro" was part of the 3rd Army Corps based in North-Western Italy. The 3rd Army Corps was tasked with defending Lombardy and Piedmont in case the 4th Alpine Army Corps and 5th Army Corps would have failed to stop Warsaw Pact forces east of the Adige river.

1975 army reform  
Before the Italian Army reform of 1975 the division had the following organization:

  Armored Division "Centauro", in Novara
  1st Armored Bersaglieri Regiment, in Civitavecchia
 Command and Services Company, in Civitavecchia (includes an anti-tank guided missile platoon)
 I Bersaglieri Battalion, in Civitavecchia (M113 armored personnel carriers)
 VI Tank Battalion, in Civitavecchia (M47 Patton main battle tanks)
 XVIII Tank Battalion, in Civitavecchia (M47 Patton main battle tanks)
  3rd Bersaglieri Regiment, in Milan
 Command and Services Company, in Milan (includes an anti-tank guided missile platoon)
 IV Tank Battalion, in Solbiate Olona (M47 Patton main battle tanks)
 XVIII Bersaglieri Battalion, in Milan (M113 armored personnel carriers)
 XXV Bersaglieri Battalion, in Solbiate Olona (M113 armored personnel carriers)
  31st Tank Regiment, in Bellinzago Novarese
 Command and Services Company, in Bellinzago Novarese (includes an anti-tank guided missile platoon)
 I Tank Battalion, in Bellinzago Novarese (M47 Patton main battle tanks)
 II Tank Battalion, in Bellinzago Novarese (M47 Patton main battle tanks)
 XXVIII Bersaglieri Battalion, in Bellinzago Novarese (M113 armored personnel carriers)
  131st Armored Artillery Regiment, in Vercelli
 Command and Services Battery, in Vercelli
 I Self-propelled Field Artillery Group, in Vercelli (M109G 155mm self-propelled howitzers)
 II Self-propelled Field Artillery Group, in Civitavecchia (M109G 155mm self-propelled howitzers)
 III Self-propelled Field Artillery Group, in Novara (M109G 155mm self-propelled howitzers)
 IV Heavy Self-propelled Field Artillery Group, in Vercelli (M44 155mm self-propelled howitzers)
 V Heavy Self-propelled Artillery Group, in Vercelli (M55 203mm self-propelled howitzers)
 VI Light Anti-aircraft Artillery Group (Reserve), in Vercelli (L60 40mm anti-aircraft guns and 12.7mm anti-aircraft machine guns)
 Artillery Specialists Battery, in Vercelli
 "Cavalleggeri di Lodi" Squadrons Group, in Lenta (Fiat Campagnola reconnaissance vehicles and M47 Patton tanks)
 Light Aviation Unit "Centauro", at Vercelli Air Base (L-19E Bird Dog light aircraft and AB 206 reconnaissance helicopters)
 Engineer Battalion "Centauro", in Bellinzago Novarese
 Signal Battalion "Centauro", in Novara
 Services Grouping "Centauro", in Novara
 Command and Services Company, in Novara
 Supply, Repairs, Recovery Unit "Centauro", in Bellinzago Novarese
 Transport Unit "Centauro", in Novara
 I Services Battalion "Centauro" (Reserve), in Milan
 II Services Battalion "Centauro", in Civitavecchia
 III Services Battalion "Centauro", in Bellinzago Novarese

In 1975 the Italian Army undertook a major reorganization of it forces: the regimental level was abolished and battalions came under direct command of newly formed multi-arms brigades. The 3rd Bersaglieri Regiment became the 3rd Mechanized Brigade "Goito" and the 31st Tank Regiment became the 31st Armored Brigade "Curtatone". The units of the 1st Armored Bersaglieri Regiment were transferred to the Mechanized Brigade "Granatieri di Sardegna" in Rome. On 21 October 1975 the Centauro took command of the two newly created brigades and additional units to bring it up to full strength.

  Armored Division "Centauro", in Novara
 Command Unit "Centauro", in Novara
 Divisional Artillery Command, in Vercelli
  131st Heavy Field Artillery Group "Vercelli", in Vercelli (M114 155mm towed howitzers)
  205th Heavy Field Artillery Group "Lomellina", in Vercelli (M114 155mm towed howitzers)
 Artillery Specialists Group "Centauro", in Vercelli
 11th Light Anti-aircraft Artillery Group "Falco" (Reserve), in Vercelli
  15th Squadrons Group "Cavalleggeri di Lodi", in Lenta
  26th Infantry Battalion "Bergamo" (BAR), in Diano Castello
  72nd Infantry Battalion "Puglie" (BAR), in Albenga
  131st Engineer Battalion "Ticino", in Bellinzago Novarese
  231st Signal Battalion "Sempione", in Novara
  Logistic Battalion "Centauro", in Bellinzago Novarese
 46th Reconnaissance Helicopters Squadrons Group "Sagittario", at Vercelli Air Base
 Command and Services Squadron
 461st Reconnaissance Helicopters Squadron (AB 206 reconnaissance helicopters)
 462nd Reconnaissance Helicopters Squadron (AB 206 reconnaissance helicopters)
 Medical Battalion "Centauro" (Reserve), in Novara
  3rd Mechanized Brigade "Goito", in Milan
 Command and Signal Unit "Goito", in Milan
  4th Tank Battalion "M.O. Passalacqua", in Solbiate Olona (Leopard 1A2 main battle tanks)
  6th Bersaglieri Battalion "Palestro", in Turin
  10th Bersaglieri Battalion "Bezzecca", in Solbiate Olona
  18th Bersaglieri Battalion "Poggio Scanno", in Milan
  3rd Field Artillery Group "Pastrengo", in Vercelli (M114 155mm towed howitzers)
  Logistic Battalion "Goito", in Monza
 Anti-tank Company "Goito", in Turin
 Engineer Company "Goito", in Novara
  31st Armored Brigade "Curtatone", in Bellinzago Novarese
 Command and Signal Unit "Curtatone", in Bellinzago Novarese
  1st Tank Battalion "M.O. Cracco", in Bellinzago Novarese (Leopard 1A2 main battle tanks)
  101st Tank Battalion "M.O. Zappala", in Bellinzago Novarese (Leopard 1A2 main battle tanks)
  28th Bersaglieri Battalion "Oslavia", in Bellinzago Novarese
  9th Self-propelled Field Artillery Group "Brennero", in Vercelli (M44 155mm self-propelled howitzers)
  Logistic Battalion "Curtatone", in Bellinzago Novarese
 Anti-tank Company "Curtatone", in Bellinzago Novarese
 Engineer Company "Curtatone", in Novara
  Mechanized Brigade "Legnano", in Bergamo
 Command and Signal Unit "Legnano", in Bergamo
  2nd Bersaglieri Battalion "Governolo", in Legnano
  67th Mechanized Infantry Battalion "Montelungo", in Monza
  68th Mechanized Infantry Battalion "Palermo", in Bergamo
  20th Tank Battalion "M.O. Pentimalli", in Legnano (Leopard 1A2 main battle tanks)
  11th Field Artillery Group "Monferrato", in Cremona (M114 155mm towed howitzers)
  Logistic Battalion "Legnano", in Presezzo
 Anti-tank Company "Legnano", in Monza
 Engineer Company "Legnano", Bergamo

Armored Brigade "Centauro" 
The 31st Armored Brigade "Curtatone" was named for the Battle of Curtatone and Montanara fought during the First Italian War of Independence. The brigade's authorized strength was 3,381 men (214 Officers, 516 non-commissioned officers and 2,651 soldiers). On 31 October 1986 the Italian Army abolished the divisional level and brigades, that until then had been under one of the Army's four divisions, came forthwith under direct command of the Army's 3rd or 5th Army Corps. As the Centauro a historically significant name, the division ceased to exist on 31 October in Novara, but the next day in the same location the Armored Brigade "Centauro" was activated. The new brigade took command of the units of the 31st Armored Brigade "Curtatone", whose name was stricken from the roll of active units of the Italian Army. The brigade was part of the 3rd Army Corps based in North-Western Italy and was organized as follows:

  Armored Brigade "Centauro", in Novara
 Command and Signal Unit "Centauro", in Novara
  1st Tank Battalion "M.O. Cracco", in Bellinzago Novarese (Leopard 1A2 main battle tanks)
  101st Tank Battalion "M.O. Zappalà", in Bellinzago Novarese (Leopard 1A2 main battle tanks)
  28th Bersaglieri Battalion "Oslavia", in Bellinzago Novarese (VCC-2 armoured personnel carriers)
  9th Self-propelled Field Artillery Group "Brennero", in Vercelli (M109 155mm self-propelled howitzers)
  Logistic Battalion "Centauro", in Bellinzago Novarese
 Bersaglieri Anti-tank Company "Centauro", in Bellinzago Novarese
 Engineer Company "Centauro", in Novara

1990–2000 
During the 1990s the brigade's structure fluctuated wildly as the Italian Army drew down its forces after the end of the Cold War. On 5 November 1990 the 11th Infantry (Recruits Training) Battalion "Casale" in Casale Monferrato joined the brigade, followed on 1 June 1991 by a medical battalion from the disbanded Mechanized Brigade "Goito". On 1 July 1991 101st Tank Battalion joined the Bersaglieri Brigade "Garibaldi" and transferred to Persano in the south of Italy. In the following year the 1st Tank Battalion was renamed 31st Tank Regiment without changing its size or composition, similarly the 9th Self-propelled Field Artillery Group became the 131st Self-propelled Field Artillery Regiment. The Anti-tank company was disbanded and the Sapper company merged into the Command and Signal Unit to form the Command and Tactical Supports Unit "Centauro".

On 9 October 1995 the 31st Tank Regiment received the war flag and name of the 4th Tank Regiment and transferred its own name and war flag to the 133rd Tank Regiment in Altamura, followed on 10 October 1995 by the 131st Self-propelled Field Artillery Regiment "Centauro", which received the war flag and name of the 52nd Self-propelled Artillery Regiment "Torino" from the disbanding Mechanized Brigade "Legnano" and transferred its own name and war flag to the 2nd Self-propelled Artillery Regiment "Potenza" in Barletta. The 31st Tank Regiment and 131st Artillery Regiment became both units of the Mechanized Brigade "Pinerolo".

During 1996 the brigade also gained the 2nd and 3rd Bersaglieri regiments from the Legnano, while the 28th Bersaglieri Battalion was disbanded. On 5 November 1996 the 21st Infantry Regiment "Cremona" in Alessandria from the disbanded Motorized Brigade "Cremona" entered the brigade. Followed by the Regiment "Nizza Cavalleria" (1st) in Pinerolo, which was transferred from the 3rd Army Corps. In 1998 the 11th Infantry (Recruits Training) Battalion "Casale" was transferred to the army's Training Brigade, thus the "Centauro" brigade entered the new millennium with the following units:

  Mechanized Brigade "Centauro", in Novara
 Command and Tactical Supports Unit "Centauro", in Novara
  Regiment "Nizza Cavalleria" (1st), in Pinerolo (Centauro tank destroyers)
  4th Tank Regiment, in Bellinzago Novarese (Ariete main battle tanks)
  2nd Bersaglieri Regiment, in Legnano (VCC-2 armoured personnel carriers)
  3rd Bersaglieri Regiment, in Milan (VCC-2 armoured personnel carriers)
  21st Infantry Regiment "Cremona", in Alessandria (VCC-2 armoured personnel carriers)
  52nd Self-propelled Artillery Regiment "Torino", in Vercelli (M109L 155mm self-propelled howitzers)
  Logistic Battalion "Centauro", in Bellinzago Novarese
 Medical Battalion "Centauro", in Novara

2000–2002 
In 2000 the Logistic Battalion and Medical Battalion were transferred to the army's newly formed Logistic Brigade. The 2nd Bersaglieri Regiment was disbanded in 2001, followed by the brigade on 5 October 2002. The remaining units were distributed among other brigades: the Nizza Cavalleria joined the Alpine Brigade "Taurinense", the 3rd Bersaglieri and 4th Tank Regiment joined the Armored Brigade "Ariete", the 21st Infantry Regiment "Cremona" and 52nd Self-propelled Artillery Regiment joined the Cavalry Brigade "Pozzuolo del Friuli".

See also
131st Armored Division "Centauro"

External links
 Italian Army Homepage: "Centauro" Division and Brigade History

References 

Armored brigades of Italy